Agostino Melissi (1615 in Florence – 1683 in Florence) was an Italian painter of the Baroque period, active mainly in Florence.

Biography
He was the pupil first of Matteo Rosselli, then of Giovanni Bilivert starting in 1634. He made cartoons of Andrea del Sarto paintings used to weave large tapestries in the Medicean Arrazeria.

References

External links

1615 births
1683 deaths
17th-century Italian painters
Italian male painters
Painters from Florence
Italian Baroque painters